James E. Cunningham  (August 28, 1916 – June 6, 1992) was an American politician who served in the California State Senate for the 36th district from 1951 to 1957 and during World War II he served in the United States Army. He was mayor of San Bernardino and worked as a judge.

References

External links
Join California James E. Cunningham Sr.

United States Army personnel of World War II
1916 births
1992 deaths
20th-century American politicians
Republican Party California state senators